Hays County is a county located in the cental portion of the U.S. state of Texas.. It is part of the Austin-Round Rock metropolitan area. As of the 2020 census, its official population had reached 241,067. The county seat is San Marcos. Hays, along with Comal and Kendall Counties, was listed in 2017 as one of the nation's fastest-growing large counties with a population of at least 10,000. From 2015 to 2016, Hays County, third on the national list, had nearly 10,000 new residents during the year.

The county is named for John Coffee Hays, a Texas Ranger and Mexican–American War officer, and fought the Texas- Comanche wars of the 1800s.

History

Hays County has been inhabited for thousands of years. Evidence of Paleo-Indians found in the region goes as far back as 6000 BC. Archeological evidence of native agriculture goes back to 1200 AD.

The earliest Europeans to arrive in the area were explorers and missionaries from the Spanish Empire.  Father Isidro Félix de Espinosa, Father Antonio de San Buenaventura y Olivares, and  Pedro de Aguirre traveled through the area in 1709. A few years later,  French-Canadian Louis Juchereau de St. Denis was attacked by Comanches in 1714.

More permanent European influence was established in 1755, when the Mission San Francisco Xavier de los Dolores was established among the Apache tribe.
In 1831, Coahuila y Tejas issued a land grant to Juan Martín de Veramendi, to Juan Vicente Campos in 1832, and to Thomas Jefferson Chambers in 1834. The Mexican government issued a land grant to the first Anglo-American settler in the county, Thomas G. McGhee of Tennessee, in 1835.

On March 1, 1848, the legislature formed Hays County from Travis County. The county is named for Tennessee native Captain John Coffee Hays of the Texas Rangers. San Marcos was named as the county seat. The legislature established Blanco from part of Hays in 1858, but incorporated part of Comal into Hays. Risher and Hall Stage Lines controlled 16 of 31 passenger and mail lines in Texas.

In 1861, voters in the county favored secession from the Union. The next year, the state legislature transferred more of Comal County to Hays County.  In 1867, the first cattle drive from Hays County to Kansas occurred.

The International-Great Northern Railroad was completed from Austin to San Marcos in 1880. Camp Ben McCulloch, named after a brigadier general, was organized in 1896 for reunions of United Confederate Veterans. A teacher's college, Southwest Texas State Normal School, was established in San Marcos in 1899.

Wonder Cave opened to the public in 1900. The current Hays County Courthouse in San Marcos was erected in 1908 in Beaux-Arts style by architect C.H. Page and Bros.  The Aquarena Springs tourist site opened in 1928 in San Marcos.

Lyndon Baines Johnson graduated from Southwest Texas State Teachers College in 1930. In 1942, construction of San Marcos Army Air Field began. San Marcos Army Air Field was renamed Gary Air Force Base in 1953 to honor Second Lieutenant Arthur Edward Gary, the first San Marcos resident killed in World War II.

The state legislature resurveyed the Hays and Travis County lines, adding  to Hays County, in 1955.
In 1964, U.S. President Lyndon Johnson announced the establishment of a Job Corps center based at the deactivated Gary Air Force Base.

Geography
The county is predominantly in the Edwards Plateau, with the south east portion in the Texas Blackland Prairies.

Adjacent counties
 Travis County (northeast)
 Caldwell County (southeast)
 Guadalupe County (south)
 Comal County (southwest)
 Blanco County (northwest)

Transportation

Major highways
  Interstate 35
  U.S. Highway 290
  State Highway 21
  State Highway 80

Airport
 San Marcos Regional Airport - general aviation airport without commercial flights

Education 
School districts in Hays County include: 
 Blanco
 Comal
 Dripping Springs Independent
 Hays Consolidated Independent
 Johnson City
 San Marcos Consolidated
 Wimberley Independent

As of 2020, the county has six high schools, 10 middle schools, and 24 elementary schools.

Higher education in Hays County includes one four-year institution, Texas State University, in San Marcos.

Austin Community College is the designated community college for the whole county. It operates three distance-learning centers that offer basic and early college start classes, along with testing centers for online classes.

Demographics

Note: the US Census treats Hispanic/Latino as an ethnic category. This table excludes Latinos from the racial categories and assigns them to a separate category. Hispanics/Latinos can be of any race.

As of the 2015 Texas population estimate program, the county's population was 193,963: non-Hispanic Whites, 106,919 (55.1%); non-Hispanic Blacks, 5,860 (3.0%); other non-Hispanics, 6,624 (3.4%); and Hispanics and Latinos (of any race), 74,560 (38.4%).

As of the census of 2000, 97,589 people, 51,265 households, and 22,150 families resided in the county. The population density was 144 people per square mile (56/km2). The 55,643 housing units averaged 53 per mi2 (20/km2). The racial makeup of the county was 78.92% White, 3.68% Black or African American, 0.69%Native American, 0.79% Asian, 0.07% Pacific Islander, 13.36% from other races, and 2.49% from two or more races. About 29.57% of the population were Hispanic or Latino of any race.

Of the 33,410 households, 34.0% had children under 18 living with them, 53.1% were married couples living together, 9.00% had a female householder with no husband present, and 33.7% were not families; 21.0% of all households were made up of individuals, and 4.9% had someone living alone who was 65 or older. The average household size was 2.69, and the average family size was 3.21.

A Williams Institute analysis of 2010 census data found  about 7.4 same-sex couples per 1,000 households in the county.

The county's population was distributed as 24.5% under 18, 20.5% from 18 to 24, 28.2% from 25 to 44, 19.1% from 45 to 64, and 7.7% who were 65 or older. The median age was 28 years. For every 100 females, there were 101.30 males. For every 100 females 18 and over, there were 99.50 males.

The county's median household income was $45,006 and the median family income was $56,287. Males had a median income of $35,209 versus $27,334 for females. The county's per capita income was $19,931. About 6.40% of families and 14.30% of the population were below the poverty line, including 10.30% of those under age 18 and 9.70% of those age 65 or over.

Politics 
Hays County was once strongly Democratic leaning in federal elections. However, like some other suburban counties in the state, the county began trending towards the Republican Party in the 1970s. The county has subsequently trended Democratic in the late 2010s and early 2020s, backing Democrats for governor (in 2018), Senate (in both 2018 and 2020), and President (in 2020). 

Until 2020 when Joe Biden did both with 54.4% of the vote, the last Democrat to carry Hays County in a presidential election was Bill Clinton with a plurality of 39.8% of the vote in 1992 and the last Democrat to win a majority of the vote in the county was Jimmy Carter, with 54.4% in 1976. Lloyd Bentsen had been the last Democratic Senate candidate to carry the county, winning 69.2% of the vote in 1988, until 2018, when Beto O'Rourke carried the county with 57.1% of the vote.

Ann Richards was the last Democratic gubernatorial candidate to win the county with 56.6% of the vote in 1990, until Lupe Valdez won with a 49.6% plurality in 2018.

Democratic voters mostly reside along the I-35 Corridor and communities East. Communities West of the I-35 Corridor lean Republican. San Marcos, home of Texas State University, and the city of Kyle generally vote Democratic. Buda, Dripping Springs, and Wimberley generally vote Republican.

Communities

Cities (multiple counties)
 Austin (primarily in Travis County and a small part in Williamson County)
 Niederwald (partly in Caldwell County)
 San Marcos (county seat) (small parts in Caldwell and Guadalupe counties)
 Uhland (partly in Caldwell County)

Cities

 Buda
 Dripping Springs
 Hays
 Kyle
 Mountain City
 Wimberley
 Woodcreek

Village
 Bear Creek

Census-designated places
 Belterra
 Driftwood

Ghost town
 Goforth

Gallery

See also

 List of museums in Central Texas
 National Register of Historic Places listings in Hays County, Texas
 Recorded Texas Historic Landmarks in Hays County

References

Further reading

External links

 Hays County government's website 
 
 HaysWeb - Hays County Information
 Hays County Historical Commission

 
1848 establishments in Texas
Populated places established in 1848
Texas Hill Country
Greater Austin